Piercys Mill is an unincorporated community in Greenbrier County, West Virginia, United States.

Within the community is Piercy's Mill Cave, a privately-owned cavern that extends just under a mile. A stream flows out of the cave's mouth and into Muddy Creek, a tributary of the Greenbrier River. A side passage inside of Piercy's Mill Cave leads to a series of rimstone dam rooms.

References

Unincorporated communities in Greenbrier County, West Virginia
Unincorporated communities in West Virginia